Kristen Syrett is a linguist whose work focuses on language acquisition, psycholinguistics, semantics, and pragmatics.

Biography
Syrett is an Associate Professor of Linguistics at Rutgers University and Director of the Rutgers Laboratory for Developmental Language Studies. She completed her Ph.D. at Northwestern University in 2007 as a student of Jeffrey Lidz, Christopher Kennedy, and Sandra Waxman, with a dissertation titled Learning about the structure of scales: Adverbial modification and the acquisition of the semantics of gradable adjectives. She has been on the faculty at Rutgers since 2011, where she is also the Undergraduate Program Director of linguistics, and previously was Assistant Professor (2011-2017). Before joining the faculty, she was first a postdoctoral associate at the Rutgers Center for Cognitive Science (2007-2008) and then a postdoctoral fellow at the Rutgers Center for Cognitive Science (2008-2011).

Syrett is a prominent figure in the Linguistics Society of America (LSA), having been twice awarded the Linguistic Service Award, first in 2007 and again as a co-awardee in 2020. In 2018, she received the Early Career Award from the LSA, which recognizes "scholars early in their career who have made outstanding contributions to the field of linguistics". As a student she received the prestigious Bernard and Julia Bloch Fellowship, the highest award to students offered by the society, and served as the student delegate to the executive committee of the LSA. In 2021 she became the Chair of the LSA's Public Relations Committee.

Selected publications

Books

Syrett, K. and S. Arunachalam, Eds. (2018). Semantics in Language Acquisition. John Benjamins.

Selected articles

 Kennedy, C. and K. Syrett (2022). "Numerals denote degree quantifiers: Evidence from child language". Measurements, Numerals and Scales, 135-162.
 Syrett, Kristen, Christopher Kennedy, and Jeffrey Lidz. (2010). "Meaning and Context in Children's Understanding of Gradable Adjectives". Journal of Semantics'', 27(1):1-35.

References

Living people
Linguists
Semanticists
Linguists from the United States
Rutgers University faculty
Northwestern University alumni
Women linguists
Year of birth missing (living people)